Julian Stark (born 8 March 2001) is a German footballer who plays as a central midfielder for  club SC Freiburg II.

Career
Stark began his youth career with FC Beuren-Weildorf and FC 03 Radolfzell, before joining the academy of 1. FC Heidenheim in 2017. In June 2020, he signed his first professional contract with Heidenheim. He made his debut for the club in the 2. Bundesliga on 18 April 2021, coming on as a substitute in 86th minute for Tim Kleindienst against Jahn Regensburg. The away match finished as a 3–0 win for Heidenheim.

For the 2022–23 season, Stark moved to SC Freiburg II in 3. Liga.

Personal life
Stark was born in Überlingen, and grew up in the Beuren district of Salem, Baden-Württemberg.

References

External links
 
 
 
 

2001 births
Living people
People from Überlingen
Sportspeople from Tübingen (region)
Footballers from Baden-Württemberg
German footballers
Association football midfielders
1. FC Heidenheim players
SC Freiburg II players
2. Bundesliga players
3. Liga players